Arthur Sze (born December 1, 1950) is an American poet, translator, and professor. Since 1972, he has published ten collections of poetry. Sze's ninth collection Compass Rose (2014) was a finalist for the 2015 Pulitzer Prize for Poetry. Sze's tenth collection Sight Lines (2019) won the 2019 National Book Award for Poetry.

Sze was the first Poet Laureate of Santa Fe, New Mexico, where he resides and is a professor emeritus at the Institute of American Indian Arts.

Early life and education
Sze is a second-generation Chinese American, born in New York City on December 1, 1950. His parents initially immigrated to the United States due to the Japanese occupation of China, but they stayed when the Chinese Civil War continued. He was raised in Queens and Garden City on Long Island. Sze graduated from the Lawrenceville School in 1968. Between 1968 and 1970, Sze attended the Massachusetts Institute of Technology. In 1970, he transferred to the University of California, Berkeley to pursue poetry.

Career
His poems have appeared in The American Poetry Review, Boston Review, Conjunctions, The Kenyon Review, Mānoa, The Paris Review, The New Yorker, and the Virginia Quarterly Review, and have been translated into Albanian, Chinese, Dutch, Italian, Romanian, and Turkish. He has authored eight books of poetry, including Compass Rose (Copper Canyon Press, 2014). This latter volume was a finalist for the 2015 Pulitzer Prize for Poetry.

He has been included in anthologies such as Articulations: The Body and Illness in Poetry (University of Iowa Press, 1994), Premonitions: The Kaya Anthology of New Asian North American Poetry, (Kaya Production, 1995), I Feel a Little Jumpy around You (Simon & Schuster, 1996), What Book!?: Buddhist Poems from Beats to Hiphop (Parallax Press 1998), and American Alphabets (Oberlin College Press, 2006).

He was a Visiting Hurst Professor at Washington University in St. Louis, a Doenges Visiting Artist at Mary Baldwin College, and has conducted residencies at Brown University, Bard College, and Naropa University. He is a professor emeritus at the Institute of American Indian Arts, is the first poet laureate of Santa Fe and has won three grants from the Witter Bynner Foundation for Poetry.

In 2012, Sze was elected a Chancellor of the Academy of American Poets.

Reception
The poet Jackson Mac Low has said: "The word 'compassion' is much overused, 'clarity' less so, but Arthur Sze is truly a poet of clarity and compassion." Albuquerque Journal reviewer John Tritica: commented that Sze "resides somewhere in the intersection of Taoist contemplation, Zen rock gardens and postmodern experimentation." Critic R.W. French notes that Sze's poems "are complex in thought and perception; in language, however, they have the cool clarity of porcelain. The surface is calm, while the depths are resonant. There is about these poems a sense of inevitability, as though they could not possibly be other than what they are. They move precisely through their patterns like a dancer, guided by the discipline that controls and inspires."

Personal life
Sze he lives in Santa Fe, New Mexico with his wife, Carol Moldaw, and their daughter. Sze also has a son from a previous marriage.

Awards
 Lila Wallace-Reader's Digest Writers' Award
 Guggenheim Fellowship, 
 American Book Award
 Lannan Literary Award for Poetry, 
 Two National Endowment for the Arts Creative Writing fellowships 
 George A. and Eliza Gardner Howard Foundation Fellowship
 Western States Book Award for Translation.
 Jackson Poetry Prize, 2013 (awarded by Poets & Writers)
National Book Award for Poetry, 2019

Bibliography

Poetry
Collections
 
 
 
 
 
 
 
 
 
 
 
 
 

Translations
 

In anthology

As editor
 Chinese Writers on Writing. Ed. Arthur Sze. (Trinity University Press, 2010).

References

External links
Profile at the Poetry Foundation
Profile and poems at Poets.org
"An E-view with Arthur Sze", Rebecca Seiferle, The Drunken Boat
Lunch Poems: Arthur Sze, UCTV, 4-28-08 (30 mins, audio) 
"Add-Verse" a poetry-photo-video project Arthur Sze participated in
Sze reading at the Lensic Theater in Santa Fe, New Mexico on 1 April 1997. Video (30 mins) 
 
 

Living people
1950 births
20th-century American poets
21st-century American poets
20th-century translators
American male poets
American writers of Chinese descent
Chinese–English translators
Lawrenceville School alumni
Massachusetts Institute of Technology alumni
University of California, Berkeley alumni
Mary Baldwin University faculty
Institute of American Indian Arts faculty
Washington University in St. Louis faculty
American Book Award winners
National Book Award winners
Poets from New York (state)
Poets from New Mexico
Writers from Queens, New York
Writers from Santa Fe, New Mexico
People from Garden City, New York
20th-century American male writers
21st-century American male writers
Municipal Poets Laureate in the United States